Wayne Black and Kevin Ullyett were the defending champions but did not compete that year.

Karsten Braasch and André Sá won in the final 6–0, 7–5 against Petr Luxa and Radek Štěpánek.

Seeds
Champion seeds are indicated in bold text while text in italics indicates the round in which those seeds were eliminated.

 Jonas Björkman /  Todd Woodbridge (quarterfinals)
 Byron Black /  Thomas Shimada (semifinals)
 Rick Leach /  David Macpherson (quarterfinals)
 Wayne Arthurs /  Paul Hanley (quarterfinals)

Draw

External links
 2001 Salem Open Doubles Draw

Hong Kong Open (tennis)
Doubles